Emily Cook (born July 1, 1979 in Belmont, Massachusetts) is an American freestyle skier who has competed since 1995. Her first World Cup victory was in an aerials event in Russia in 2008. She has eight career World Cup podiums, over 30 World Cup top tens and five National Championships wins.

Career
Cook missed the 2002 Winter Olympics in her home of Salt Lake City after breaking both feet on a jump in Lake Placid, New York two weeks earlier.

At the 2006 Winter Olympics in Turin, Cook finished 19th in the aerials event. Her best finish at the FIS Freestyle World Ski Championships was fourth in the aerials at Inawashiro in 2009.

Cook was named to the U.S. team for the 2010 Winter Olympics in January 2010 and competed on the 2014 U.S. Olympic team in Sochi, Russia.  She is coached by Todd Ossian.

Sochi 2014
Sochi 2014 was Emily's third Olympic games. On February 14, 2014, Cook completed the Freestyle Skiing Ladies' Aerials Qualification with a score of 80.01 for 5th place and the finals with a score of 64.50 for 8th place. Her finals score went down from her qualifying score because she was unable to stick her landing. Her 8th-place finish was her best placing in her Olympic career.

Personal life
Born in Belmont, Massachusetts, Emily's mother died when she was two years old. She began skiing when she was four years old and moved on to freestyle at age fourteen. She attended Belmont High School and a private skiing school in Maine, Carrabassett Valley Academy. She made the U.S. Freestyle team at age seventeen, which is when she moved to Park City, Utah. Emily attended the University of Utah.

Charity Work
Emily supports many non-profit organizations which include The Speedy Foundation, Kids Play International, Right To Play, Women's Sports Foundation, The Youth Winter Sports Alliance. She also created a mentorship program, the Visa Champions Creating Champions.

In November 2014, Cook received the Athletes in Excellence Award from The Foundation for Global Sports Development, in recognition of her community service efforts and work with youth.

References

External links

"The Concierge Questionnaire-Emily Cook Interview" www.conciergequestionnaire.com 2009-09-17 retrieved 2010-02-02
Personal Website
Twitter

1979 births
American female freestyle skiers
Freestyle skiers at the 2006 Winter Olympics
Freestyle skiers at the 2010 Winter Olympics
Freestyle skiers at the 2014 Winter Olympics
Living people
Olympic freestyle skiers of the United States
Belmont High School (Massachusetts) alumni
University of Utah alumni
21st-century American women